Mycolicibacterium aurum is a species of the phylum Actinomycetota (Gram-positive bacteria with high guanine and cytosine content, one of the dominant phyla of all bacteria), belonging to the genus Mycolicibacterium.

The species is an acid fast, gram positive bacteria that forms long chains. Though related to Mycobacterium tuberculosis, it does not cause tuberculosis.

References
SKERMAN (V.B.D.), McGOWAN (V.) and SNEATH (P.H.A.) (editors): "Approved Lists of Bacterial Names". International Journal of Systematic Bacteriology. 1980, 30, 225–420.

TSUKAMURA (M.): "Adansonian classification of mycobacteria". Journal of General Microbiology, 1966, 45, 253–273.

External links
Type strain of Mycobacterium aurum at BacDive -  the Bacterial Diversity Metadatabase

Acid-fast bacilli
aurum
Bacteria described in 1966